Khorshīd or Khorshēd (meaning the Sun or the "Radiant Sun"), also spelled as Khurshed and Khurshid, is a Persian given name. In the modern day as well as historical Iran, Turkey, and Azerbaijan, but also in Iraqi Kurdistan, Egypt, Central Asia and South Asia, it is mostly a given name for boys. The origin of the word is related to the Avestan divinity Hvare-khshaeta. In Turkish, it is sometimes written as Hurşit.

People
Khurshid of Tabaristan (died 761), last Dabuyid ruler of Tabaristan
Khurshid of Dailam (died 865), a Justanid king
Khurshid Khan, fifteenth-century minister of Sylhet
Hurshid Pasha (died 1822), Ottoman general and Grand Vizier
Hurşit Güneş (born 1957), Turkish politician
Khurshed Alam Khan (born 1919), Indian Congress Party senior leader
Khurshed Mahmudov (born 1982), Tajikistani footballer
Khurshed Nariman, Mayor of Mumbai (1935–1936)
Khursheed Bano (1914–2001), pioneer film actress and singer of the Indian cinema
Khurshid Ahmad (disambiguation)
Hurşit Atak (born 1991) Turkish weightlifter
Khurshid Mahmud Kasuri (born 1941), Pakistani politician and diplomat
Khurshid Rizvi (born 1942)

Surname
Khurshid Hasan Khurshid (1924–1988), first elected president of Azad Kashmir, Private secretary of Muhammad Ali Jinnah
Omar Khorshid, (1945–1981), Egyptian instrumental guitarist
Salman Khurshid (born 1953), Indian Congress Party politician

Places
Khorshid, Iran (disambiguation)

Other
Khurshid TV, Afghan television station

See also
Khorshid (newspaper)
Khurshid (disambiguation)
Khorshidi dynasty

Persian masculine given names
Persian feminine given names
Azerbaijani unisex given names
Egyptian masculine given names
Pakistani unisex given names